Prazniki is a small settlement south of Turjak in the Municipality of Velike Lašče in central Slovenia. The entire area is part of the traditional region of Lower Carniola and is now included in the Central Slovenia Statistical Region.

There is a small Baroque chapel-shrine in the settlement. It was built in the 18th century.

References

External links
Prazniki on Geopedia

Populated places in the Municipality of Velike Lašče